Nugzar Aragvis Eristavi was a Georgian duke (eristavi) of the Duchy of Aragvi from 1600 to 1611. He was the nephew of the previous duke, Avtandil I. Nugzar was a boy when his uncle died, and he was still young as well when he got control over the duchy from his "illegitimate cousins". In his early years as duke, Nugzar managed to force Mtiuleti into submission. In 1578, Simon I of Kartli (Shahnavaz Khan) was released from captivity by his Safavid overlords in order to fight the Ottomans during the Ottoman–Safavid War of 1578–1590. Some months after however, he took revenge on allies of Nugzar – the eristavi of Ksani as well as the Amilakhori family, in retaliation for their behavior during Simon I's first tenure as ruler of Kartli. In 1580, Simon I defeated Alexander II of Kakheti, whom Nugzar was dependent on, but Nugzar himself apparently managed to evade Simon I's wrath. During David I's brief usurpation of the Kakhetian kingdom (1601-1602), Nugzar was defeated by David. Soon after however, Nugzar switched his allegiance to George X of Kartli. The latter had promised Nugzar a daughter in marriage to his eldest son, Baadur (Bahadur). During the Ottoman–Safavid War of 1603–1618, Safavid king Abbas I (r. 1588-1629) summoned George X and Nugzar, but he later sent them both back to Kartli in order to bolster their defences. In 1610, when Nugzar received his son-in-law Giorgi Saakadze (Mūrāv-Beg), he was reportedly the master of all lands situated between the three Aragvi streams. His last appearance in the records is in 1611. Nugzar I had two sons; Baadur and Zurab (Sohrab). Baadur succeeded Nugzar as eristavi of the duchy, who in turn was succeeded by Zurab (1619–1629).

References

Sources
 
 
 

16th-century people from Georgia (country)
17th-century people from Georgia (country)
17th-century deaths
Nobility of Georgia (country)
16th-century people of Safavid Iran
17th-century people of Safavid Iran